In English, the letter Q is usually followed by the letter U, but there are some exceptions. The majority of these are anglicised from Arabic, Chinese, Hebrew, Inuktitut, or other languages that do not use the English alphabet, with Q representing a sound not found in English. In other examples, Q represents  in standard Arabic, such as in qat, faqir and Qur'ān. In Arabic, the letter ق, traditionally romanised as Q, is quite distinct from ك, traditionally romanised as K; for example,   means "heart" but   means "dog". However, alternative spellings are sometimes accepted, which use K (or sometimes C) in place of Q; for example, Koran (Qur'ān) and Cairo (al-Qāhira).

Of the 82 words in this list, 78 are (or can be) interpreted as nouns, and most would generally be considered loanwords; the only modern-English words that contain Q not followed by U and are not borrowed from another language are freq, qiana, QWERTY, and tranq. However, all of the loanwords on this list are considered to be naturalised in English according to at least one major dictionary (see References), often because they refer to concepts or societal roles that do not have an accurate equivalent in English. For words to appear here, they must appear in their own entry in a dictionary; words that occur only as part of a longer phrase are not included.

Proper nouns are not included in the list. There are, in addition, many place names and personal names, mostly originating from Arabic-speaking countries, Albania, or China, that have a Q without a U. The most familiar of these are the countries of Iraq and Qatar, along with the derived words Iraqi and Qatari. Iqaluit, the capital of the Canadian territory of Nunavut, also has a Q that is not directly followed by a U. Qaqortoq, in Greenland, is notable for having three such Qs. Other proper names and acronyms that have attained the status of English words include Compaq (a computer company), Nasdaq (a US electronic stock market), Qantas (an Australian airline), and QinetiQ (a British technology company). Saqqara (an ancient burial ground in Egypt) is a proper noun notable for its use of a double Q.

Words
<onlyinclude>
Unless noted otherwise, all words listed here are assumed to be pluralized by adding -s or -es. References in the "Sources" column relate to the headword in column one; variant spellings are then separately referenced. The sources given are selective, and the absence of a reference to a particular dictionary does not necessarily mean that the word does not appear in that dictionary.

In American and Canadian English, there are currently 4,422 words with Q and no U including the following words in the table below.

Uses in Scrabble
In many word games, notably in Scrabble, a player must build a word using a certain set of letters.  If a player is obliged to use a q but does not have a u, it may be possible to play words from this list. Not all words in this list are acceptable in Scrabble tournament games. Scrabble tournaments around the world use their own sets of words from selected dictionaries that may not contain all the words listed here.

Qi is the most commonly played word in Scrabble tournaments, and was added to the official North American word list in 2006. 

Other words listed in this article, such as suq, umiaq or qiviut, are also acceptable, but since these contain a u, they are less likely to be useful in the situation described.

List of dictionaries cited
[AH]: 
[AHC]: 
[AOX]: 
[C]: 
[Co]: 
[COD]: 
[E]: 
[L]: 
[LC]: 
[MW]: 
[MWO]: 
[ODE]: 
[OED]: 
[OSPD4]: 
[RHU]: 
[RHW]: 
[SOED]: 
[TWL]: 
[W]: 
[WI]:

See also
 Constrained writing
 English words without vowels

References

Bibliography

 
 
 
 Scrabble Word Lists Q without U – Parker Brothers, attributed to: 

Dynamic lists
Q not followed by U
Scrabble